Manushyaputhran is a 1973 Indian Malayalam film, directed by Baby and produced by Kadakkavoor Thankappan. The film stars Madhu, Jayabharathi, Vidhubala and Vincent in the lead roles. The film had musical score by G. Devarajan.

Cast

Madhu as Karthikeyan
Jayabharathi as Madhavi
Vidhubala as Ammu
Vincent as Thommi
Adoor Bhasi as Ammunni
Muthukulam Raghavan Pillai as Vaidyar
Prema
T. R. Omana
Adoor Bhavani as Madhavi's Mother
Bahadoor as Kochu Govindan
G. K. Pillai as Keshavan
Khadeeja as Kaalikutty
S. P. Pillai as Kunjandi

Soundtrack
The music was composed by G. Devarajan and the lyrics were written by Vayalar Ramavarma and Gowreesapattam Sankaran Nair.

References

External links
 

1973 films
1970s Malayalam-language films
Films directed by Baby (director)